Malik al-Ashtar, also known as Mālik bin al-Ḥārith al-Nakhaʿīy al-Maḏḥijīy, was one of the loyal companions of Ali ibn Abi Talib, cousin of the Islamic prophet Muhammad. According to Sunni sources, he was one of the people involved behind the murder of Uthman, the third Rashidun Caliph. According to Shia Islam, Malik remained a loyal and avid supporter of Muhammad's progeny and the Hashemite clan. He rose to a position of prominence during the caliphate of Ali and participated in several battles, such as the Battle of Jamal and Siffin against Muawiyah. His title "al-Ashtar" references an eyelid injury he received during the Battle of Yarmouk.

Birth
Although Malik's actual birth year is unknown, many historians say he was 10 years older than Ali Ibn Abi Talib and 20 years younger than Muhammad. Moreover, it is known that Malik was a Madh'hij, a sub-class of the Bani Nakha tribe from Yemen, which is also the tribe of another Sahabah named Amru bin Ma'adi Yakrib.

His lineage is traced back to Yarab bin Qahtan through his paternal surname Malik bin Al Hareth.

Conflicts with the governor of Kufa and the event of Al-Rabadha 
In the year 30 AH (after Hijra) or 650 CE, many Muslims living in the city of Kufa were angered over the action of the governor Waleed ibn Uqba (the half-brother of Uthman ibn Affan). People went to Mu'awiyah with their complaints. The gathering included Malik al-Ashtar and Kumayl ibn Ziyad. After listening to the complaints, Mu'awiyah accused Kumayl and Malik of disuniting the religion and disobeying their leader, and exiled from Shaam to Homs. 

Eventually, Malik al-Ashtar, Kumayl ibn Ziyad, and the delegation made it back to Kufa. After coming back to Kufa and failing to remove al-Waleed, the delegation, including Kumayl ibn Ziyad, was led by Malik al-Ashtar on a journey to Medina, the capital of the Muslim empire, to address the issue with Uthman. Kumayl ibn Ziyad, Malik al-Ashtar, Muhammad ibn Abi Hudhaifa, and Abdur Rahman ibn Udays were the ones who spoke out most about al-Waleed and the corruption that was occurring.

The event of Al-Rabadha 
On their way to Medina, Malik al-Ashtar and the delegation stopped at Al-Rabadha to visit Abu Dharr al-Ghifari, whose health at the time was deteriorating. He was a companion of Muhammad and firm supporter and companion of Ali, was banished to die in the desert of Al-Rabadha. Abu Dharr al-Ghifari told his wife the prophecy of his death, which had been given to him by Muhammad. Muhammad had told Abu Dharr al-Ghifari and some other companions that one of them would die in the desert, and a group of believers would attend his death. However, all of the other men present had since passed away in their houses, suggesting that Abu Dharr al-Ghifari would be the one to die in the desert. 

His wife saw the delegation's caravan from a hill and flagged them down. She told Malik and the delegation about her dying husband, and the delegation agreed to visit him. They came to Abu Dharr al-Ghifari and Malik told Abu him that they were on their way to Medina to meet with Uthman over the issue of al-Waleed. Upon hearing the news of al-Waleed, Abu Dharr al-Ghifari became sad.

After the event of Al-Rabadha, Malik and the delegation continued on their long journey to Medina. When they finally met with Uthman, they communicated their concerns and al-Waleed's behavior. However, they were unsuccessful in their mission and they decided to seek Ali's help.

Battle of Jamal

At the age of 70, Malik al-Ahstar was the main cavalry and commander of the army of Ali Ibn Abi Talib in the Battle of Jamal (Battle of the Camel).

Background 
After the downfall of Uthman, Ali was appointed as the new caliph, upsetting Ali's enemies. As a result, they planned to launch an offensive against Ali in the year 656 AD under the claim that they wanted revenge for Uthman's killing. When Ali received news that a mutiny was going to occur, he formed an army to combat the rebel forces. During the mutiny, the new governor of Kufa, Abu Musa al-Ashary, encouraged the Kufains (citizens of Kufa) not to join Ali's army. When Ali was made aware of this situation, he sent Malik al-Ashter to rally up troops. 

As a firm and loyal supporter of Ali Ibn Abi Talib, Malik rallied up the Kufians with a powerful speech. Malik and a large group of fighters then seized the palace to remove Abu Musa al-Ashary; however, he was actually at the mosque at the time. After his guards informed him that Malik al-Ashtar and a large number of fighters had taken control of the palace, Abu Musa al-Ashary surrendered and asked Malik to give him a day to leave Kufa. Malik accepted his offer and let Abu Musa al-Ashary leave peacefully. Once Abu Musa al-Ashary left, Malik delivered another powerful speech (in the mosque) that captivated the hearts of the Kufains. The speech successfully aroused more than 18,000 soldiers to join him in order to defend against the rebel attack. 9,000 of those troops were under Malik's commands and the other 9,000 were under Hasan (the eldest son of Ali) commands. They quickly headed towards Dhiqaar, Iraq to join Ali's army.

The Battle 
On the day of the Battle of Camel, Ali put Malik al-Ashtar in charge of the right wing of his army, Ammar ibn Yasir in charge of the left wing, and gave the flag to his son Muhammad ibn al-Hanafiyyah. When the battle began, Malik al-Ashtar and his soldiers advanced. During the battle, Ali told Malik that as long as Aisha's camel was standing the battle would continue. In order to end the battle Ali ordered Malik al-Ashtar to cut the feet of the Aisha's camel. In addition, he ordered Muhammad ibn Abi Bakr, the blood brother of Aisha, to catch Aisha when she falls off the camel. Both Malik and Muhammad ibn Abi Bakr carried out their assignments, thus ending the battle. 

After the battle, Malik al-Ashtar and Ammar bin Yasir went to Aisha.

Battle of Siffin

Battles over the Euphrates River 
Although the minor conflict occurred in Kirkeesya, the war took place at Siffin (on the banks of the Euphrates) when Mu'awiyah headed a large reinforcing army to join Abi al-Awar al-Salmy and his army (Mu'awiyah's first army that attacked at night). Mu'awiyah brought reinforcements because during the minor conflict many of his soldiers were killed and injured. When they got to Siffeen, Mu'awiyah ordered an offensive to his army to gain control of the Euphrates River. By taking the control of water, Mu'awiyah violated an Islamic law and the laws of war. 

Over time, Malik watched the military supply and movements taking place on the riverbanks. He then realized that Mu'awiyah was tightening the siege of the Euphrates River. Noticing that most of the soldiers were thirsty, Malik went to Ali, who subsequently wrote a letter to Muawiyah asking for water. However, Mu'awiyah refused to give the soldiers water. Ali Ibn Abi Talib called Malik and asked him to lead his soldiers in an attack to gain possession of the Euphrates River. Malik and his men fought valiantly and won back the possession of the Euphrates River.

The following day, an arrow was shot at Ali's army with an attached letter saying Mu'awiyah would be opening the river to drown Ali's army. This news caused the soldiers to withdraw from the banks of the Euphrates River, and Mu'awiyah decided to recapture the river for his army. Yet again, Ali sent his soldiers to fight of Mu'awiyah's troops and gain control of the river.

Malik's discipline and the end of the war 
As the battle continued, Malik al-Ashtar fought his way through the opposing army until he was two rows away from Mu'awiyah's tent. However, Mu'awiyah wanted to trick Ali's army to stop fighting and disunite them by creating confusion and ordered his soldiers to place the Quran on their spear. When most of the soldiers of Ali saw this, they stopped fighting and began to withdraw despite Ali's insistence they continue. Ali then commanded Malik to return for safety reasons. Although Malik knew he had the opportunity to end the war and rid the world of Ma'uwiyah, he retreated, saying, Malik said, "If Ali ibn Abi Talib orders something, I have to return".

The arbitration 
During arbitration agreements, Ali attempted to choose Abdullah bin Abbas to represent him. The rebels did not accept this, wanting Ali to choose Abu Musa al-Ashary. Ali refused, next nominating Malik al-Ashtar to represent him; again, this choice was shot down. Abu Musa al-Ashary was ultimately chosen to represent Ali in the arbitration agreement.

Assassination

Becoming governor of Egypt 
Ali Ibn Abi Talib sent Malik al-Ashtar to Egypt to help Muhammad ibn Abi Bakr, the governor at the time, who was under threat from Amr ibn al-As, one of Mu'awiyah's companions. Amr ibn al-As wanted to become governor of Egypt and had rallied 6,000 soldiers to attack Muhammad ibn Abi Bakr. 

Muhammad ibn Abi Bakr was instructed by Alī' to return to his capital city, Kufa, and Malik Al-Ashtar was appointed Governor of Egypt in 658 (38 A.H.) by Alī ibn Abī-Tālib after the Battle of Siffin had ended.

Assassination Plan 
When Mu'awiyah learned that Ali appointed Malik al-Ashtar as the new governor of Egypt, he was overwhelmed with worry because he knew of al-Ashtar's ferocious build and strength. Muawiyah formulated a plot to assassinate him using poison imported from Rome and sent a delegate with the poison to a certain man owning vast lands in al-Qilzim (a service station/resting spot for travelers) on the borders of Egypt, requesting that he poison al-Ashtar in exchange for lifelong tax exemption. The man agreed to the envoy's request.

Death of al-Ashtar 
On the way to Egypt, Malik al-Ashtar decided to stop at al-Qilzim. Upon his arrival, the man who agreed to poison Malik invited him for lunch at his house. Malik accepted the man's invitation and went to his home. The man provided Malik with poisoned honey, which he consumed. Malik realized he was poisoned as soon as he felt pain in his stomach. He placed his hand on his stomach and said "In the Name of Allah, the Most Gracious, the Most Merciful. We belong to Allah, and we'll come back to Him!" Within moments Malik al-Ashtar died. Muawiyah is said to have rejoiced upon hearing of al-Ashtar's death.

Legacy

Descendants
Malik had two sons named Ishaq (Isaac) and Ibrahim (Abraham). Ishaq was a phenomenal warrior who supported and gave his life to protect Hussain ibn Ali, the son of Ali, in the Battle of Karbala. After Habib ibn Muzahir, Ishaq killed the most enemy fighters. On the other hand, Ibrahim ibn Malik al-Ashtar, the son of Malik al-Ashtar, along with Mukhtar al-Thaqafi rose against the killers of Hussain ibn Ali. The two killed most of the killers of Hussain and his army. For example, they caught and killed Umar ibn Sa'ad, Shimr ibn Thil-Jawshan, Sanan ibn Anas, Hurmala ibn Kahil and Ubaidullah Ibn Ziyad (these were Yazid I's soldiers who fought against Hussain).

Among his descendants are the Kalbasi family, who reside in Iran and Iraq. One branch of this family adds the title "Ashtari" to the end of their family name to denote this fact. 
In Lebanon, the Hamadani family from the southern town of Nabatieh are also direct descendants who have maintained a family tree dating back to the Nakha'i tribe origins. The Mroueh family, after tracing their lineage, are also believed to be descendants. The Malek (or Malekian) family, from the Iranian province of Mazandaran are also believed to be descendants.

See also
 The Four Companions
 Letter of Ali ibn Abi Talib to Malik al-Ashtar
 Al Qaid Johar

References

External links
Sanctuary of Malik al-Ashtar in Eski Yurt, Crimea (Russian language)
Malik al-Ashtar (Ebook of Kamal al-Syyed on Malik al-Ashtar)

Arab generals
Yemeni Muslims
Ali
Deaths by poisoning
People of the First Fitna
7th-century Arabs
Rashidun governors of Mosul
Rashidun governors of Egypt